Cherkasy Forest (transliterated: Čerkas'kyj bir) is a natural pine forest located on north and north-west ends of the city Cherkasy in central Ukraine. At , it is famous as the biggest natural pine forest on the south edge of the scots pine area. Along with Irdyn Swamp and Moshnogirya Log, it creates  of unique natural area.

Flora of this forest counts more than 800 species, 18 of which are listed in The Red List of Ukraine (list of species that are in danger of vanishing). The forest was nominated as one of the 7 wonders of Cherkasy Oblast.

References

Geography of Cherkasy Oblast
Tourist attractions in Cherkasy Oblast
Forests of Ukraine